Official relations between the two countries of Palestine and the Sahrawi Arab Democratic Republic (Western Sahara) do not exist, being as neither country is fully recognised internationally. Despite this, there are informal connections.

History and modern relations
Both nations have an Arab majority. The future founder of Polisario Front, El-Ouali Mustapha Sayed, used to meet Palestinian leaders during 1970s in Lebanon, in which he was influenced by the Israeli occupation. Fearing a future Moroccan occupation of Western Sahara, the Polisario Front was established, in a similar format to the Palestine Liberation Front. The flag of Western Sahara draws from the flag of Palestine. The influence of the Sahrawi independence movement draws a level of sympathy toward Sahrawis among Palestinians.

George Habash, one of the founders of Palestine's PLO, met with Brahim Ghali in 1979 and indicated solidarity with the Western Saharan cause. Both countries share similar styles of struggling, including conducting guerrilla warfare, against both Israel and Morocco.

In recent years, fears of growing Palestinian–Sahrawi contact prompted the Moroccan authorities to censor them, allying with a number of groups that opposed any alliance. In 2016, the Palestinian Solidarity Committee with Western Sahara was banned from entering Gaza by Hamas.

The 2020 Israel–Morocco normalization agreement later laid speculations on deepening future relations between Palestine and the SADR, amidst censorship.

References

State of Palestine–Sahrawi Arab Democratic Republic relations
Sahrawi Arab Democratic Republic
Palestine